Lieutenant-General Sir Henry Merrick Lawson KCB (30 January 1859 – 2 November 1933) was a British Army General during World War I.

Military career
Educated at Cheltenham College and the Royal Military Academy Woolwich, Lawson was commissioned into the Royal Engineers in 1877.

He took part in the Suakin Expedition and Nile Expedition in 1884 and served in the Egyptian Army during the Mahdist War in 1898. He served in the Second Boer War between 1899 and 1902, and following the end of the war in June that year stayed on as Deputy-Adjutant and Quartermaster-General to the Forces in South Africa. He became Director of Movements and Quarterings at the War Office in 1904. He was appointed Commander of 13th Infantry Brigade in Dublin in 1906 and Major-General in charge of Administration for Aldershot Command in 1907.

He became General Officer Commanding 2nd Division in 1910 and Lieutenant Governor of Guernsey and Alderney in 1914. He went on to be Deputy Chief of the Imperial General Staff in November 1914, General Officer Commanding-in-Chief for Northern Command in 1915 and then went into "Special Service" at the front in 1916. He was critical that too many men were doing "soft jobs" in the War and thereby encouraged the formation of the Women's Auxiliary Army Corps. Finally he was Inspector General of Communications for the Italian Expeditionary Force from 1917 to 1918; he retired in 1921.

Political career
Lawson was twice a Parliamentary candidate for the Liberal Party. At the 1922 general election he stood in the constituency of Portsmouth South in a straight fight losing against sitting Conservative MP Herbert Cayzer. Soon after, Cayzer resigned through ill-health and when the new Tory MP Leslie Orme Wilson also resigned on his appointment as Governor of Bombay, Lawson was pressed back into service by the local Liberal Association. His opponent in the by-election, which took place on 13 August 1923, was none other than Herbert Cayzer, health clearly recovered. Lawson's campaign, while not returning him to Parliament, reduced the Conservative majority from 5,867 to 2,121.

Family
In 1912 he married Lady Wilma, daughter of the 5th Earl of Radnor, and widow of 2nd Earl of Lathom.

References

External links
Lawson, H.M, Man-Power in Egypt, Report, 17 May 1917, Cairo, Egypt, 1917.
Australian Light Horse Studies Centre
 

|-

|-

|-
 

1859 births
1933 deaths
British Army generals of World War I
Knights Commander of the Order of the Bath
Royal Engineers officers
British Army personnel of the Mahdist War
British Army personnel of the Second Boer War
Liberal Party (UK) parliamentary candidates
People educated at Cheltenham College
British Army lieutenant generals
Graduates of the Royal Military Academy, Woolwich